Constantine III (also Constantine V; ; , Western Armenian transliteration: Gosdantin or Kostantine; April 17, 1313 – December 21, 1362) was the King of Armenian Cilicia from 1344 to 1362. He was the son of Baldwin, Lord of Neghir (a nephew of Hethum I of Armenia), and second cousin of Constantine II.

When Constantine II was killed in an uprising in 1344, Constantine III succeeded him. He attempted to wipe out all rival claimants to the throne; he gave orders to kill Constantine II's nephews, Bemon and Leo, but before the murder could be carried out they escaped to Cyprus. During his rule, Armenian Kingdom of Cilicia was reduced by Mamluk raids and conquests. They conquered Ajazzo in 1347, Tarsus and Adana in 1359.

Constantine was the first husband of Maria, daughter of Oshin of Corycos and Joan of Taranto. He was predeceased by his two sons. Upon his death from natural causes he was succeeded by his cousin Constantine IV.

References

Notes

1313 births
1362 deaths
Kings of the Armenian Kingdom of Cilicia
14th-century Armenian people
Hethumid dynasty